Apatetris agenjoi is a moth of the family Gelechiidae. It is found in Spain and Portugal.

References

Moths described in 1954
Apatetris
Moths of Europe